Pop Drunk Snot Bread is the eleventh studio album by rock band Bowling for Soup, released on April 22, 2022, by Brando/Que-so Records. It is their first studio album since 2016’s Drunk Dynasty, as well as the first to feature Rob Felicetti on bass and backing vocals, following former bassist Erik Chandler’s departure from the band in 2019.

Background and production
The band originally intended to release singles, "as that's what people listen to now". However, they recorded a full album in the Poconos to be able to spend more time together. The new album announcement came with the release of their new song "I Wanna Be Brad Pitt" on February 25, 2022.

Track listing

 "Greatest of All Time (Reprise)" ends at 1:01, followed by hidden track "Belgium" at 4:00.

Personnel
 Jaret Reddick – lead vocals, rhythm guitar
 Chris Burney – lead guitar, backing vocals
 Rob Felicetti – bass guitar, backing vocals
 Gary Wiseman – drums, backing vocals

Charts

References

2022 albums
Bowling for Soup albums